William Whitford Blackburn, Jr. (February 5, 1923April 17, 2007) was a professional American football player who played center for six seasons for the Chicago Cardinals.

Alvin Dark was a halfback and teammate of Blackburn with the Southwestern Louisiana Institute in 1944. He recalled that "the joy for me was running behind Humble and Blackburn. I'd never seen such blocking."

References

1923 births
2007 deaths
People from Okfuskee County, Oklahoma
American football centers
Louisiana Ragin' Cajuns football players
Rice Owls football players
Chicago Cardinals players